Herodian architecture is a style of classical architecture characteristic of the numerous building projects undertaken during the reign (37–4 BC) of Herod the Great, the Roman client king of Judea. Herod undertook many colossal building projects, most famously his reconstruction of the Temple in Jerusalem (c. 19 BC). Many of his structures were built upon comparable, previous Hasmonean buildings and most of his have, in their turn, vanished as well.

Innovations
Herod introduced numerous architectural innovations and construction techniques in his buildings, such as the domes inside the Double Gate to the Temple Mount. He adapted the mikveh—a Jewish ritual bath—for use as the frigidarium in the Roman-style bathhouses in his many palaces. Herod also developed an innovative combination of palace and fortress; examples include the Antonia Fortress in Jerusalem, the Herodium in the Judean Desert about 2 miles south of Bethlehem, and Masada. Characteristically, they have (or had) one tower higher and stronger than the others. Herod's fortification innovations strongly influenced the military architecture of subsequent generations.

In line with contemporary Jewish customs, Herod generally avoided the representation of human and animal figures, even in the closed and private parts of his palaces, but there were a few exceptions. Herod's Palace reportedly had bronze figures (probably animals) through which water was dispensed. Towards the end of his reign, Herod erected a golden eagle above the gate of the Temple. This caused some outrage within the city, and several youths removed and destroyed the eagle. They were subsequently executed.

Herod's Temple

In the eighteenth year of his reign (20–19 BC), Herod rebuilt the Second Temple in Jerusalem on "a more magnificent scale". The new Temple was finished in a year and a half, although work on out-buildings and courts continued another eighty years. To comply with religious law, Herod employed a thousand priests as masons and carpenters for the rebuilding. The finished temple, which was destroyed by the Romans in 70 AD, is often referred to as Herod's Temple. The Wailing Wall (Western Wall) in Jerusalem was for many years the only section visible of the four retaining walls whose construction was begun by Herod to create a flat platform (the Temple Mount) upon which his Temple was constructed. Recent findings suggest that the Temple Mount walls and Robinson's Arch may not have been completed until at least 20 years after his death during the reign of Herod Agrippa II.

Herod's palace-fortresses
Herod constructed several lavish palace-fortresses within his kingdom. His palace at Herodium, 12 km south of Jerusalem, rose to a height of about 45 meters. He also built palace-fortresses in Jerusalem, Masada, and Caesarea Maritima.

Herodian masonry
Herod's massive building projects featured a distinctive style of stone-dressing. This stone-dressing method—usually featuring the pale local meleke limestone—was so prominently practiced in Herod's day that it has led to such terms as “Herodian blocks”, “Herodian masonry”, “Herodian dressing”, and the like. It makes Herodian stones easily discernible from the earlier stone courses below, and later ones above, in the surviving walls at many sites. Best known is the example of the impressive retaining walls of the Temple Mount, readily visible at the Western Wall.

Enormous quantities of stone were needed for these structures and the remains of the numerous quarries used can still be found, especially in the vicinity of Jerusalem's Old City, notably those to the north known as Solomon's Quarries. Freeing the stones from the bedrock was an elaborate process: Wide grooves were chiseled with metal tools around the intended stone block. The block was then freed up by driving metal wedges into the grooves. The initial dressing of the stone was probably accomplished on site before transport. Many of these stones were very large, weighing between two and five tons. (The largest found, in the Western Wall Tunnel, measures some 12.8 meters in length, 3.4 meters high and 4.3 meters deep; it weighs about 660 tons.) Once moved to the building site,  further fine chiseling was done and the blocks were hauled into place using ramps, cranes and crow bars. The stones were laid in dry courses, typically about 1 meter high without the use of any mortar. Each course was set 3 to 5 cm back from the course underneath it. Final dressing and refinements were carried out once the stones had been set in place.

The huge rectangular building blocks, laid in horizontal courses, feature flat, projecting central portions (bosses) surrounded by narrow, shallow dressed margins (“marginal drafts”) creating a finely chiseled, frame-like effect. The depressed “frame” is sunk some 2 centimeters below the smooth face of the stone and its average width is about 8 centimeters. A wide, toothed chisel was used to smooth the stone margins.

The origins of this margin-cutting style predate Herod, as witnessed by the Hellenistic architecture of Alexandria, Asia Minor, and Greece itself, as well as by examples in the Levant (e.g., the palace of the Sons of Tuvia at Iraq, el-Amir in Jordan (near Amman), dating from at least the 3rd century BC). Examples of pre-Herodian margin stone-cutting are also attested in Jerusalem itself: at the “Tower of David” (the Paza’el Tower), in the "First city wall" and in the Hasmonean Tower unearthed in the Jewish Quarter. Authentic “Herodian masonry” includes examples at the sites at Hebron (Elonei Mamre, the Cave of Machpelah), in the Augusteum in Sebastia and possibly also in the Herodian platform at Caesarea Maritima. In Jerusalem, in addition to the Temple Mount, Herodian stones are preserved beneath the Damascus Gate. It has been observed that this distinctive stone-dressing style serves as a decorative theme on Second Temple period ossuaries found in the Jerusalem area.

List of major Herodian building projects

Herod's Palace in Jerusalem (Last quarter, 1st century BC)
The Temple Mount, Jerusalem (ca. 19 BC)
Herod's Temple
Western Wall
Western Wall Tunnel
Western Stone
Robinson's Arch
Antonia Fortress
Royal Stoa (Jerusalem)
Roman public facilities, Jerusalem (1st century BC)
Theater, amphitheater, hippodrome (Remains have been found but not much is known)
Renovation of the Pool of Siloam
Jerusalem water channel
Jerusalem pilgrim road
The Royal Complex at Herodium (Last quarter, 1st century BC)
The Palace-fortress
The Lower Herodium complex
Herod's Tomb
The palace-fortress at Masada (37–15 BC)
Machaerus, Hasmonean fortress rebuilt by Herod in 30 BC
Antipatris, named by Herod in memory of his father, Antipater
Cypros Palace near Jericho, named by Herod in memory of his mother, Cypros
Alexandrium, a Hasmonean palace which Herod rebuilt lavishly.
Caesarea Maritima with its palace and harbor (25–13 BC)
Cave of the Patriarchs
Sebaste, now Sebastia at Nablus, which Herod restored and expanded
Three Winter Palaces, Jericho (starting 36 BC)
Three temples dedicated to Augustus (at Sebaste, Caesarea, and Panias, with the last identified with Omrit)

See also

Meleke

Notes

References

Books
Connolly, Peter (1983), Living in the Time of Jesus of Nazareth, Oxford University Press (This popular treatment includes many excellent illustrations and diagrams of Herod's buildings.)
Levine, L. I. (2002), Jerusalem – Portrait of the City in the Second Temple Period, Philadelphia: Jewish Publication Society.
Netzer, Ehud (2006), The Architecture of Herod, the Great Builder, Tübingen: Mohr Siebeck.
Richardson, P. (1996), Herod: King of the Jews and Friend of the Romans, Columbia: University of South Carolina Press. pp. 174–191, 201–202
Rocca, S. (2008), Herod's Judaea: A Mediterranean State in the Classical World (Texts and Studies in Ancient Judaism, 122), Tübingen: Mohr Siebeck.
Roller, D. W. (1998), The Building Program of Herod the Great, Berkeley: University of California Press.

Films
Herod's Lost Tomb (2008; National Geographic Society), in addition to examining Netzer's purported find of Herod's tomb, most of Herod's large projects are reconstructed in CGI.

Jews and Judaism in the Roman Empire
Ancient sites in Jerusalem
Archaeological sites in Israel
Architectural history
Architectural styles
Former buildings and structures in Israel
Herod the Great
Herodian dynasty
Second Temple
Temple Mount
1st-century BC architecture